The foreign, diplomatic, economic, and political relations between Croatia and France are bound together by shared history, intellectual development (Illyrian movement), an overlap in religion (Roman Catholicism), commonalities in language (nearly 10% of Croatians speak French) and kinship ties that reach back thousands of years, including kindred, ancestral lines.

The relations unofficially began during the Carolingian Renaissance in the years 800–900 with religious activity between French Benedictine monks, and the construction of Croatian monasteries. The speaking of French in Croatia can be traced to the 14th century with the religious diffusion of the crusades, and the usage of Croatian texts in French religious studies during the 15th century. Many of the Croatian elite studied at the French Sorbonne during the later 15th century and influenced the political landscape of France for decades to come (i.e. Saro Gučetić negotiated secret pacts on behalf of the French King, Francis I). In the following two centuries, Croatian elite were active in court and in French cultural and scientific (referred to as the frančezarije in Croatian) life. During the 1789 French revolution, the principles of the enlightenment spread rapidly throughout Croatia. During the early 19th century, large parts of Croatia became an autonomous state of France during the first French Empire of Napoleon Bonaparte. This created a French cultural diffusion throughout the Croatian regions and consolidated the connection between the two countries. The cultural diffusion of Croatian culture in France is known as Illyrianism. After the collapse of Yugoslavia, Croatian–French relations reached an all-time high when the French intellectual community convinced the world that Croatia was an independent state by listing it in its dictionaries and atlases.

France and Croatia are military and political allies, both of whom share memberships in the European Union (E.U.), United Nations (U.N.), North Atlantic Treaty Organization (NATO), World Trade Organization (WTO), and are obliged to share a common currency. Both countries share the national sport of football (soccer) and the striped red-white-blue tricolor as their national colors. Croatia is France's 10th largest trading partner. Croatians have full access to the French labour market and vice versa. Modern relations between the two countries are extremely cooperative, prosperous diplomatically, and highly economically positive. France has three different representations in Croatia (in Zagreb, Dubrovnik, and Split) and Croatia has two different representations in France (in Paris and Toulouse). Francois Hollande described the relations between the two countries as "excellent," with Zoran Milanović noting their common values as "forever together."

Country comparison

History 

The connection between France and Croatia began with the spread of monasteries in Croatia by French Benedictine monks during the 800s and early 900s. Religious diffusion between the two regions began with France's influence on Croatian Catholicism. In 925, Croatia was elevated to the status of Kingdom and the notions of nobility quickly followed. Over the coming centuries Croatian nobility assumed French practices to great controversy. This contributed to wide spread political and social elitism among the nobles and monarch. The nobility regarded the peasant class as an unseen and irrelevant substrata of people which lead to high causality revolts and beheadings as well as sporadic periods of intense domestic violence. This strained ties with French culture and lead the people of Croatia to denounce French elitism. However, in In 1040, French liturgical books and reliquaries were brought to Zagreb to create its first Diocese.

French historian of the Fourth Crusade, Geoffroi de Villehardouin, described in Old French Zagreb as the “one of the best fortified cities in the world" later adding "that no more beautiful, stronger nor richer city could be found." During the 14th century, French began to be diffused into Croatian society starting in Zagreb. Many of the Croatian elite studied at the French Sorbonne during the later 15th century and influenced the political landscape of the country for decades to come. One of the most prominent members was Saro Gučetić, who, upon request of the French King Francis I with Suleiman the Magnificent, negotiated secret pacts with neighboring countries. The expansion of literature in France during the early 16th century lead to many Croatian writers to be translated into French for the public. The first diplomatic relation between France and Croatia was the establishment of a consulate in Dubrovnik. The growing connection between the two countries was known as the frančezarije, and was formalized with the first French Masonic lodge in Croatia. As the 1789 French revolution progressed, the ideas of enlightenment deeply influenced Croatian society, which lead to the creation of Jacobin clubs in Zagreb and Dubrovnik.
During the expansion of Napoleon Bonaparte's First French Empire, large parts of Croatia were controlled by the French leading to the creation of the Illyrian Provinces. In 1809, Napoleon Bonaparte and his administration established this territory in Ljubljana (Laybach) as an extension against the Austrian Empire in what mostly comprised modern day Croatia and parts of Slovenia. The provinces had four governors during its existence: Auguste de Marmont, Henri Gatien Bertrand, Jean-Andoche Junot, and Joseph Fouché.

During French rule the official languages of the autonomous province were French, Croatian, Italian, German, and Slovene. Although the French did not entirely abolish the feudal system, their rule familiarized in more detail the inhabitants of the Illyrian Provinces with the achievements of the French revolution and with contemporary bourgeois society. They introduced equality before the law, compulsory military service and a uniform tax system, and also abolished certain tax privileges, introduced modern administration, separated powers between the state and the church (the introduction of the civil wedding, keeping civil registration of births etc.), and nationalized the judiciary. The occupants made all the citizens theoretically equal under the law for the first time.French rule in the Illyrian Provinces was short-lived, yet it significantly contributed to greater national self-confidence and awareness of freedoms, especially in the Slavic nations as exampled in post Yugoslavian independence Croatia, and Slovenia. The influence of the Illyrian Territories and the rejection of Austrian rule, has prompted a French cultural diffusion and national appreciation in certain areas of the countries that made up the providences that last to this day. In Croatia, the cities and towns of Zagreb, Split, Rijeka, Osijek, Zadar, and Velika Gorica have distinct French and Illyrian customs that remain a remnant of 19th century French rule. In Slovenia and Montenegro, streets and small regions are named after governors of the providences and Bonaparte. During this time the spread of Illyrian movement was expansive in France and lead to the creation of the seminal work: Les peuples de l’Autriche et de la Turquie; histoire contemporaine des Illyriens, des Magyars, des Roumains et des Polonais, which served as an "introductory study on Croatia and the Illyrian Movement."

During the 1860s, the Croatian school system began to introduce French as a language of study and formally integrated into the national curriculum in 1876. French writer Émile Zola–a descendant of Zadar–was one of the most prominent writers of this movement.

During the later 1950s, the capital of Croatia became a cultural center mostly due to the fact that Yugoslavia was not aligned with any sovereign. French philosopher Jean-Paul Sartre visited Zagreb in 1960 and met with prominent Croatian writers and philosophers. With the collapse of Yugoslavia, Croatia struggled to be internationally recognized. French intellectuals such as Mirko Dražen Grmek–a native Croat and naturalised Frenchman–helped attract high-profile French figures to help Croatia.

France recognized Croatia on 15 January 1992 and established diplomatic relations three months later. President of Croatia Ivo Josipović was invited by Francois Hollande to celebrate the National Day of France in July 2013. Minister of State for European Affairs Harlem Désir visited Croatia on July 14, 2015 to celebrate French Independence Day and met with Prime Minister Zoran Milanović.

Economic activity 

France and Croatia share the common Euro market with their memberships of the European Union. French companies tend to develop the transport infrastructure sectors in Croatia. The construction of the Zagreb Airport in thanks to the Bouygues-Aéroports de Paris (ADP) investment of €250-€300 in 2012 substantially increased the public perception of France in Croatia. Their trading agreement and activity reached a market value of €535 million in 2015 (+16.3% compared to 2014). France accounts for 2.3% of Croatia's total trade in 2014, making it the 10th largest trading partner. French exports to Croatia amounted to €364 million in 2015 (+17% compared to 2014) which marks a sharp increase from the previous five years of stagnation and decline. Croatia supplied €171.3 million worth of imports to France in 2015. France is the seventh-largest investor in Croatia with annual investments of €651 million in FDI.

Political and diplomatic activity 
The countries share common western values, and assess European and international issues in line with each other. The two countries have inter-parliamentary exchanges. In 2009, Croatia served as a temporary member of the United Nations Security Council with France.

France created Croatia's "administrative adaptation processes" that helped it become the 28th E.U. state. In January 2013, Croatia's EU Treaty was ratified by the French Parliament. French Minister Delegate for European Affairs Thierry Repentin visited Zagreb in 2013 in support of its membership in the EU.

After the 2015 Paris terrorist attacks the government of Croatia made November 16, 2015 a national mourning day in the country and flew their flags half mast. Croatian Prime Minister Zoran Milanovic marched in Paris with the "March for Democracy" to grieve the victims.

Sports rivalry 

France and Croatia began competing against each other in a series of friendly exhibition games, however since 1998, their encounters have become increasingly competitive. As both countries have the red-white-blue tricolor, matches between the two are nicknamed Le derby tricolore ("Tricolor Derby") or Trobojnica  ("Tricolor" game). During the 1998 World Cup, both France and Croatia reached their then-pinnacle of international prowess after the former won the tournament after defeating the latter who took third place. Twenty years later, the two teams battled the 2018 World Cup final where France overcame Croatia 4–2 to secure the trophy. Similarly to 1998, the match with France elevated Croatia to its highest-ever ranking with runners-up positioning. The two teams have competed against each other six times with France winning four matches, and drawing two.

Croatia and France also played against each other in the 2018 Davis Cup final with Croatia winning its second title.

Sister-twinning cities 
Croatia and France share five twin towns (or sister cities) with each other.
  Rueil-Malmaison, Paris, France, and   Dubrovnik, Croatia 
  Villefranche-de-Rouergue, Aveyron, France, and  Pula, Croatia
  Auxerre, Burgundy, France, and  Varaždin, Croatia
  Romans-sur-Isère, Drôme, France, and  Zadar, Croatia
  Saint-Dié-des-Vosges, Vosges, France, and  Crikvenica, Croatia

As of May 2017, French officials jointly announced with their Croatian counterparts the possible partnerships with the following cities:
  Marseille, France, and  Split, Croatia
  Bourges, France, and  Sibenik, Croatia
  Le Havre, France, and  Rijeka, Croatia

See also 
 Foreign relations of Croatia
 Foreign relations of France
 France–Serbia relations 
 France–Slovenia relations 
 Croatia–Italy relations
 French people of Croatian descent
 Croatian people of French descent
 France–Yugoslavia relations
 2018 FIFA World Cup Final

References

Further reading 
 Croatian-French relations by http://croatia.eu

External links 
 Croatian Embassy in Paris, France
 French Embassy in Zagreb, Croatia

 
France
Croatia